Slovakia is competing at the 2013 World Aquatics Championships in Barcelona, Spain between 19 July and 4 August 2013.

Swimming

Slovak swimmers achieved qualifying standards in the following events (up to a maximum of 2 swimmers in each event at the A-standard entry time, and 1 at the B-standard):

Men

Women

Synchronized swimming

Slovakia has qualified two synchronized swimmers.

See also
Slovakia at other World Championships in 2013
 Slovakia at the 2013 UCI Road World Championships
 Slovakia at the 2013 World Championships in Athletics

References

External links
Barcelona 2013 Official Site
Slovenská Plavecká Federácia 

Nations at the 2013 World Aquatics Championships
2013 in Slovak sport
Slovakia at the World Aquatics Championships